Sögur 1980–1990 is a compilation of Icelandic singer Bubbi Morthens' greatest hits from 1980 to 1990. The title Sögur means "stories".

This double CD contains 34 songs and features the Icelandic rock legend Megas who sings with Bubbi on "Fatlafól". Guðlaugur Kristinn Óttarsson is featured here adding guitars on two tracks: "Friðargarðurinn" and "Þau Vita Það" which were taken from Nóttin Langa (1989).

Track listing

External links
Official site of Bubbi Morthens
Official web site of Guðlaugur Kristinn Óttarsson
Page of G. K. Óttarsson on MySpace

Bubbi Morthens albums
1999 compilation albums